Gāoshǒu (English "expert") is Taiwanese Mandopop artist Will Pan's fourth Mandarin studio album. It was released by Universal Music Taiwan on 8 July 2005.  A second edition The Expert (Celebration Version) (CD+DVD) was released on 23 August 2005 with a bonus DVD. The song "I Have to Love" was also included in her self titled debut studio album with the same name which was released on 20 October 2006 under the label Enjoy Music.

The tracks "誰是 MVP" (Who's MVP) and "不得不愛" (I Have to Love) with Zhang Xianzi were nominated for Top 10 Gold Songs at the Hong Kong TVB8 Awards, presented by television station TVB8, in 2005.

Track listing

Bonus DVD
The Expert (Celebration Version)
 Back 4 More
 About "誰是 MVP" (Who's MVP)
 "誰是 MVP" (Who's MVP) MV
 About "不得不愛" (I Have to Love)
 "不得不愛" (I Have to Love) MV
 About "高手" (The Expert)
 "高手" (The Expert) MV

Notes

References

External links
  Will Pan discography@Universal Music Taiwan

2005 albums
Will Pan albums
Universal Music Taiwan albums